Sajid–Wajid was an Indian Bollywood Hindi film music director duo consisting of brothers Sajid Khan and Wajid Khan, the sons of Sharafat Ali Khan, a tabla player.

Wajid Khan, the younger of the two brothers, died on June 1, 2020. Since then, Sajid Khan has continued as a solo music director.

Members

Sajid Khan

Sajid Ali Khan (date of birth unknown), also known by the mononym Sajid, is the elder son oftabla player Ustad Sharafat Ali Khan and his wife, Razina Khan. He is married to Lubna Khan and the couple has two daughters, Muskaan and Mehek.

Sajid studied at the Academy of Asiatic Cinema and Television. He trained under various artists, including his father as well as Allahrakha Khan and Das Babu. His paternal grandfather was Ustad Abdel Latif, an influential Indian artist. His maternal grandfather was Ustad Faiyyaz Ahmed Khan, a Padma Shri awardee.

Prior to making a career in music, he worked in import-export business. After encouragement from his parents and friends, he concentrated himself exclusively to music as a solo artist. He was also a music director releasing music under his own name. He later encouraged his younger brother, Wajid, to also take up music, with the two working as a duo under the name Sajid–Wajid. After the death of his brother on 1 June 2020, Sajid has been continuing as a solo artist.

Wajid Khan

Wajid Ali Khan was the younger son of artist and tabla player Sharafat Ali Khan and Razina Khan. He joined to his elder brother Sajid Khan to form the artistic duo Sajid–Wajid. He also had a separate singing career as a solo act and was nominated for a number of awards as a playback artist.

Wajid studied at Mithibai College where he met his college sweetheart Kamalrukh. The two dated for almost 10 years while Wajid was heavily involved in tours and in the musical formation. Family restrictions also postponed the marriage as Kamalrukh Khan, of Zoroastrian (Parsi) faith, refused to convert to Wajid's Sunni Muslim faith. Eventually, they married each other under the Special Marriages Act that allowed her to keep her religion and marry without conversion despite the opposition of Wajid's family. The couple had two children, Arshi, a daughter (born ) and Hrehaan, a son (born ).

In 2014, Wajid filed separation papers because of continuing religious and parental pressure and the couples divorced. Kamalrukh did not receive alimony since the case was pending in the court when Wajid died. Their children, however, received maintenance amount from their father pendente lite as per the Court's Order, according to Kamalrukh's interview to Sri Iyer of PGuris. Kamalrukh continues working as a clinical hypnotherapist and wellness coach. She also writes a regular fortnightly column for Hindustan Times titled "Weekend Fix for the Soul".

Wajid's health gradually deteriorated with him undergoing a kidney transplant in 2019 that was considered successful. He also developed subsequent throat infections. On 31 May 2020, he was urgently transferred to hospital with serious complications of COVID-19 and died one day later on 1 June 2020 following a heart attack.

Career
Sajid–Wajid first scored music for Salman Khan's Pyar Kiya To Darna Kya in 1998. In 1999, they scored music for Sonu Nigam's album Deewaana. They composed music for several films further. The music duo has also composed music for several films starring Salman Khan. They were mentors on the reality shows Sa Re Ga Ma Pa Singing Superstar, Sa Re Ga Ma Pa 2012 and composed title track for television reality shows Bigg Boss 4 and Bigg Boss 6. Sajid–Wajid also the composed IPL 4 theme song "Dhoom Dhoom Dhoom Dhadaka", with Wajid singing the title track.

Sajid–Wajid as music directors

Non-film albums
Sajid–Wajid have scored music for some albums as music directors.

Sajid–Wajid as lyricists

Sajid–Wajid as background score composers

Wajid songs

Sajid Songs

Awards

After death of Wajid Khan 

After the death of Wajid Khan on 1 June 2020, his older brother Sajid Ali Khan is continuing as a solo artist but Sajid khan continues the title of Sajid–Wajid. He participated in IPML as captain of Delhi Jammers as Sajid–Wajid.

References

External links
 Official website
 
 
 

Indian Muslims
Filmfare Awards winners
Indian film score composers
Indian musical duos
Indian male film score composers
Year of birth missing (living people)